A by-election was held for the New South Wales Legislative Assembly electorate of East Sydney on 7 November 1891 because Edmund Barton was appointed Attorney General in the third Dibbs ministry. Such ministerial by-elections were usually uncontested and the other seven other ministers, George Dibbs (The Murrumbidgee), Henry Copeland (New England), John Kidd (Camden), William Lyne (The Hume), John See (Grafton), Thomas Slattery (Boorowa) and Francis Suttor (Bathurst), were re-elected unopposed.

Dates

Result

Edmund Barton was appointed Attorney General in the third Dibbs ministry.

See also
Electoral results for the district of East Sydney
List of New South Wales state by-elections

References

1891 elections in Australia
New South Wales state by-elections
1890s in New South Wales